Adam Henrich (born January 19, 1984) is a Canadian former professional ice hockey player.

Henrich was drafted as the 60th overall selection in the 2002 NHL Entry Draft by the Tampa Bay Lightning. He was Tampa Bay's first selection of the draft. Henrich has also played for the Wilkes-Barre/Scranton Penguins, Springfield Falcons and Norfolk Admirals. Overall, he has played on 13 teams in 7 leagues in his hockey career.

Playing career
Henrich played for Team Canada at the 1997 Maccabiah Games and the 2013 Maccabiah Games in Israel, where they won  gold medals.

Henrich played minor hockey in Greater Toronto, where he was a member of the provincial champion peewee Toronto Marlies in 1998, on a team that included Rick Nash.

Henrich was drafted in the first round, seventh overall by the Brampton Battalion in the 2000 OHL Priority Selection. Henrich subsequently enjoyed a successful junior career playing four seasons for the Battalion. He tied four Battalion playoff records, including most games played (32) and most power-play goals (4) in a career. His 98 career Battalion goals rank fifth all time behind only Wojtek Wolski, Cody Hodgson, Raffi Torres and Luke Lynes.

Ahead of the 2002 NHL Entry Draft, Henrich was ranked 23rd by NHL Central Scouting. As a result, he was among a group of top prospects invited to the NHL Draft Combine. At the Draft on June 22, Henrich was selected in the second round, 60th overall by the Tampa Bay Lightning.

Henrich had his strongest year for the Norfolk Admirals of the American Hockey League in the 2007–08 season.

Personal life
Henrich comes from a family of athletes. He has an older brother, Michael Henrich, who was drafted 13th overall by the Edmonton Oilers in the 1998 NHL Entry Draft.

Henrich is Jewish.  Henrich has been an advocate for Israeli hockey and the Israel Ice Hockey Federation.

Career statistics

Regular season and playoffs

International

See also
List of select Jewish ice hockey players

References

External links
 
HF's Interview with Brampton's Adam Henrich

1984 births
Asiago Hockey 1935 players
Brampton Battalion players
Canadian expatriate ice hockey players in England
Canadian expatriate ice hockey players in Italy
Canadian expatriate ice hockey players in Germany
Canadian expatriate ice hockey players in the United States
Canadian ice hockey left wingers
Cincinnati Cyclones (ECHL) players
Competitors at the 1997 Maccabiah Games
Competitors at the 2013 Maccabiah Games
Coventry Blaze players
Hamburg Freezers players
HC Alleghe players
Jewish Canadian sportspeople
Jewish ice hockey players
Johnstown Chiefs players
Living people
Maccabiah Games gold medalists for Canada
Maccabiah Games competitors by sport
Norfolk Admirals players
Ontario Reign (ECHL) players
SC Riessersee players
Ice hockey people from Toronto
Springfield Falcons players
Tampa Bay Lightning draft picks
Wheeling Nailers players
Wilkes-Barre/Scranton Penguins players